Lawrence Yearwood (25 June 1884 – 18 January 1942) was a Barbadian cricketer. He played in three first-class matches for the Barbados cricket team in 1910/11.

See also
 List of Barbadian representative cricketers

References

External links
 

1884 births
1942 deaths
Barbadian cricketers
Barbados cricketers
People from Saint James, Barbados